Stil or variant, may refer to:

 Stil Island, Vlore County, Albania
 André Stil (1921-2004), French writer
 Didier Stil (born 1964), French bobsledder
 STIL, SCL-interrupting locus protein
 Stil FM 105.5, Călăraşi, Romania
 Radio Stil (Belarus) 101.2, Minsk, Belarus
 Stil, a hand in the Dutch card game Pandoer

See also

STII (disambiguation)
Still (disambiguation)